Coastal erosion is the loss or displacement of land, or the long-term removal of sediment and rocks along the coastline due to the action of waves, currents, tides, wind-driven water, waterborne ice, or other impacts of storms. The landward retreat of the shoreline can be measured and described over a temporal scale of tides, seasons, and other short-term cyclic processes. Coastal erosion may be caused by hydraulic action, abrasion, impact and corrosion by wind and water, and other forces, natural or unnatural.

On non-rocky coasts, coastal erosion results in rock formations in areas where the coastline contains rock layers or fracture zones with varying resistance to erosion. Softer areas become eroded much faster than harder ones, which typically result in landforms such as tunnels, bridges, columns, and pillars. Over time the coast generally evens out. The softer areas fill up with sediment eroded from hard areas, and rock formations are eroded away. Also erosion commonly happens in areas where there are strong winds, loose sand, and soft rocks. The blowing of millions of sharp sand grains creates a sandblasting effect. This effect helps to erode, smooth and polish rocks. The definition of erosion is grinding and wearing away of rock surfaces through the mechanical action of other rock or sand particles.

According to the IPCC, sea level rise caused by climate change will increase coastal erosion worldwide, significantly changing the coasts and low-lying coastal areas.

Coastal processes

Hydraulic action
Hydraulic action occurs when waves striking a cliff face compress air in cracks on the cliff face. This exerts pressure on the surrounding rock, and can progressively splinter and remove pieces. Over time, the cracks can grow, sometimes forming a cave. The splinters fall to the sea bed where they are subjected to further wave action.

Attrition
Attrition occurs when waves cause loose pieces of rock debris (scree) to collide with each other, grinding and chipping each other, progressively becoming smaller, smoother and rounder. Scree also collides with the base of the cliff face, chipping small pieces of rock from the cliff or have a corrasion (abrasion) effect, similar to sandpapering.

Solution
Solution is the process in which acids contained in sea water will dissolve some types of rock such as chalk or limestone.

Abrasion
Abrasion, also known as corrasion, occurs when waves break on cliff faces and slowly erode it. As the sea pounds cliff faces it also uses the scree from other wave actions to batter and break off pieces of rock from higher up the cliff face which can be used for this same wave action and attrition.

Corrosion
Corrosion or solution/chemical weathering occurs when the sea's pH (anything below pH 7.0) corrodes rocks on a cliff face. Limestone cliff faces, which have a moderately high pH, are particularly affected in this way. Wave action also increases the rate of reaction by removing the reacted material.

Factors that influence erosion rates

Primary factors

The ability of waves to cause erosion of the cliff face depends on many factors.

The hardness (or inversely, the erodibility) of sea-facing rocks is controlled by the rock strength and the presence of fissures, fractures, and beds of non-cohesive materials such as silt and fine sand.

The rate at which cliff fall debris is removed from the foreshore depends on the power of the waves crossing the beach. This energy must reach a critical level to remove material from the debris lobe. Debris lobes can be very persistent and can take many years to completely disappear.

Beaches dissipate wave energy on the foreshore and provide a measure of protection to the adjoining land.

The stability of the foreshore, or its resistance to lowering. Once stable, the foreshore should widen and become more effective at dissipating the wave energy, so that fewer and less powerful waves reach beyond it. The provision of updrift material coming onto the foreshore beneath the cliff helps to ensure a stable beach.

The adjacent bathymetry, or configuration of the seafloor, controls the wave energy arriving at the coast, and can have an important influence on the rate of cliff erosion.  Shoals and bars offer protection from wave erosion by causing storm waves to break and dissipate their energy before reaching the shore. Given the dynamic nature of the seafloor, changes in the location of shoals and bars may cause the locus of beach or cliff erosion to change position along the shore.

Coastal erosion has been greatly affected by the rising sea levels globally. There has been great measures of increased coastal erosion on the Eastern seaboard of the United States. Locations such as Florida have noticed increased coastal erosion. In reaction to these increases Florida and its individual counties have increased budgets to replenish the eroded sands that attract visitors to Florida and help support its multibillion-dollar tourism industries.

Secondary factors
 Weathering and transport slope processes
 Slope hydrology
 Vegetation
 Cliff foot erosion
 Cliff foot sediment accumulation
 Resistance of cliff foot sediment to attrition and transport
 Human Activities

Tertiary factors
 Resource extraction
 Coastal management

Control methods
There are three common forms of coastal erosion control methods. These three include: soft-erosion controls, hard-erosion controls, and relocation.

Hard-erosion controls

Hard-erosion control methods provide a more permanent solution than soft-erosion control methods. Seawalls and groynes serve as semi-permanent infrastructure. These structures are not immune from normal wear-and-tear and will have to be refurbished or rebuilt. It is estimated the average life span of a seawall is 50–100 years and the average for a groyne is 30–40 years. Because of their relative permanence, it is assumed that these structures can be a final solution to erosion. Seawalls can also deprive public access to the beach and drastically alter the natural state of the beach. Groynes also drastically alter the natural state of the beach. Some claim that groynes could reduce the interval between beach nourishment projects though they are not seen as a solution to beach nourishment. Other criticisms of seawalls are that they can be expensive, difficult to maintain, and can sometimes cause further damage to the beach if built improperly. As we learn more about hard erosion controls it can be said for certain that these structural solutions cause more problems than they solve. They interfere with the natural water currents and prevent sand from shifting along coasts, along with the high costs to install and maintain them, their tendency to cause erosion in adjacent beaches and dunes, and the unintended diversion of stormwater and into other properties.

Natural forms of hard-erosion control include planting or maintaining native vegetation, such as mangrove forests and coral reefs.

Soft-erosion controls

Soft erosion strategies refer to temporary options of slowing the effects of erosion. These options, including Sandbag and beach nourishment, are not intended to be long-term solutions or permanent solutions. Another method, beach scraping or beach bulldozing allows for the creation of an artificial dune in front of a building or as means of preserving a building foundation. However, there is a U.S. federal moratorium on beach bulldozing during turtle nesting season, 1 May – 15 November. One of the most common methods of soft erosion control is beach nourishment projects. These projects involve dredging sand and moving it to the beaches as a means of reestablishing the sand lost due to erosion. In some situations, beach nourishment is not a suitable measure to take for erosion control, such as in areas with sand sinks or frequent and large storms. 
Dynamic revetment, which uses loose cobble to mimic the function of a natural storm beach, may be a soft-erosion control alternative in high energy environments such as open coastlines.

Over the years beach nourishment has become a very controversial shore protection measure: It has the potential to negatively impact several of the natural resources. Some large issues with these beach nourishment projects are that they must follow a wide range of complex laws and regulations, as well as the high expenses it takes to complete these projects. Just because sand is added to a beach doesn't mean it will stay there. Some communities will bring in large volumes of sand repeatedly only for it to be washed away with the next big storm. Despite these factors, beach nourishment is still used often in many communities. Lately, the U.S. Army Corps of Engineers emphasized the need to consider a whole new range of solutions to coastal erosion, not just structural solutions. Solutions that have potential include native vegetation, wetland protection and restoration, and relocation or removal of structures and debris.

Living Shorelines
The solutions to coastal erosion that include vegetation are called "living shorelines". Living shorelines use plants and other natural elements. Living shorelines are found to be more resilient against storms, improve water quality, increase biodiversity, and provide fishery habitats. Marshes and oyster reefs are examples of vegetation that can be used for living shorelines; they act as natural barriers to waves. Fifteen feet of marsh can absorb fifty percent of the energy of incoming waves.

Relocation

Relocation of infrastructure any housing farther away from the coast is also an option. The natural processes of both absolute and relative sea level rise and erosion are considered in rebuilding. Depending on factors such as the severity of the erosion, as well as the natural landscape of the property, relocation could simply mean moving inland by a short distance or relocation can be to completely remove improvements from an area. A coproduction approach combined with managed retreat has been proposed as a solution that keeps in mind environmental justice. Typically, there has been low public support for "retreating." However, if a community does decide to relocate their buildings along the coast it is common that they will then turn the land into public open space or transfer it into land trusts in order to protect it. These relocation practices are very cost-efficient, can buffer storm surges, safeguard coastal homes and businesses, lower carbon and other pollutants, create nursery habitats for important fish species, restore open space and wildlife, and bring back the culture of these coastal communities.

Tracking

Storms can cause erosion hundreds of times faster than normal weather.  Before-and-after comparisons can be made using data gathered by manual surveying, laser altimeter, or a GPS unit mounted on an ATV. Remote sensing data such as Landsat scenes can be used for large scale and multi year assessments of coastal erosion.

Examples

A place where erosion of a cliffed coast has occurred is at Wamberal in the Central Coast region of New South Wales where houses built on top of the cliffs began to collapse into the sea. This is due to waves causing erosion of the primarily sedimentary material on which the buildings foundations sit.

Dunwich, the capital of the English medieval wool trade, disappeared over the period of a few centuries due to redistribution of sediment by waves. Human interference can also increase coastal erosion: Hallsands in Devon, England, was a coastal village washed away over the course of a year, 1917, directly due to earlier dredging of shingle in the bay in front of it.

The California coast, which has soft cliffs of sedimentary rock and is heavily populated, regularly has incidents of house damage as cliffs erodes. Devil's Slide, Santa Barbara, the coast just north of Ensenada, and Malibu are regularly affected.

The Holderness coastline on the east coast of England, just north of the Humber Estuary, is one of the fastest eroding coastlines in Europe due to its soft clay cliffs and powerful waves. Groynes and other artificial measures to keep it under control has only accelerated the process further down the coast, because longshore drift starves the beaches of sand, leaving them more exposed. The white cliffs of Dover have also been affected.

The coastline of North Cove, Washington has been eroding at a rate of over 100 feet per year, earning the area the nickname "Washaway Beach." Much of the original town has collapsed into the ocean. The area is said to be the fastest-eroding shore of the United States' West Coast. Measures were finally taken to slow the erosion, with substantial slowing of the process noted in 2018.

Fort Ricasoli, a historic 17th century fortress in Malta is being threatened by coastal erosion, as it was built on a fault in the headland which is prone to erosion. A small part of one of the bastion walls has already collapsed since the land under it has eroded, and there are cracks in other walls as well.

In El Campello, Spain, the erosion and failure of a Roman fish farm excavated from rock during the first century B.C. was exacerbated by the construction of a close sport harbour.

Hampton-On-Sea is suffering from this problem as well. Hampton-On-Sea is located in Kent, England. It was at one time very popular for its oyster fishing and was very reliant on the sea. Hampton-On-Sea has undergone the effects of coastal erosion since before the 1800s. Hampton-On-Sea's coastal erosion worsened with the increase in global warming and climate change. Global warming is causing a rise in sea level, more intense and frequent storms, and an increase in ocean temperature and precipitation levels. Another reason Hampton-On-Sea had such a horrific case of coastal erosion is due to an increase in the frequency and the intensity of storms it experienced. These natural events had destroyed the Hampton Pier, Hernecliffe Gardens, a set of villas, several roads, and many other structures that once lay on Hampton-On-Sea. After this destruction, in 1899 they started building a sea wall to protect the rest of the remaining land and buildings. However, the sea wall did not offer much help: buildings continued to be affected by the erosion. Then a storm came and broke the sea wall, it then flooded the land behind it. These events cause many land investors to back out. Eventually, Hampton-On-Sea had to be abandoned because the erosion overtook so much of the land. By 1916 Hampton-On-Sea had been completely abandoned. By the 1920s only a couple of structures still stood. It was at that point that Hampton-On-Sea was said to have been finally drowned. Today only three landmarks have survived the tragedy that Hampton-On-Sea had faced. These landmarks include The Hampton Inn, The Hampton Pier, and a few roads. Although The Hampton Pier is not the same size as the original it is still working as a great place for people to fish. Today The Hampton inn is now a popular little pub known for its delicious food and its beautiful sunset view. To this day they are sharing the history of Hampton-On-Sea with others.

See also

 Beach erosion and accretion
 Beach evolution
 Beach morphodynamics
 Beach nourishment
 Raised beach
 Modern recession of beaches
Paleoshoreline
 Integrated coastal zone management
 Coastal management, to prevent coastal erosion and creation of beach
 Coastal and oceanic landforms
 Coastal development hazards
 Coastal geography
 Coastal engineering
 Coastal and Estuarine Research Federation (CERF)
 Erosion
 Bioerosion
 Blowhole
 Natural arch
 Wave-cut platform
 Longshore drift
 Deposition (sediment)
 Coastal sediment supply
 Sand dune stabilization
 Submersion

References

Works cited

External links

 Sustainable coastal erosion management in Europe

 Environment Agency guide to coastal erosion
 Wave Erosion
 
 Examine an example of wave erosion 
 Erosion & Flooding in the Parish of Easington 
 Some interesting teaching resources
 Examples of coastal landforms 
 US Economic Costs of Coastal Erosion & Inundation NOAA Economics
 British Geological Survey coastal erosion and landslides case studies

Images
 Images of Coastal features

 
Coastal construction
Coastal engineering
Coastal geography
Geomorphology